Antianeira was the name of a number of women in Greek mythology:

Antianeira, possibly mother of the Argonaut Idmon by the god Apollo.
Antianeira, mother of the Argonauts Eurytus and Echion.
Antianeira, an Amazon who succeeded Penthesilea as Queen of the Amazons. In some version of the myth, she was killed during the Trojan War fighting for the latter.

Notes

References 

 Apollonius Rhodius, Argonautica translated by Robert Cooper Seaton (1853-1915), R. C. Loeb Classical Library Volume 001. London, William Heinemann Ltd, 1912. Online version at the Topos Text Project.
 Apollonius Rhodius, Argonautica. George W. Mooney. London. Longmans, Green. 1912. Greek text available at the Perseus Digital Library.
 The Orphic Argonautica, translated by Jason Colavito. © Copyright 2011. Online version at the Topos Text Project.
Tzetzes, John Posthomerica translated by Ana Untila.

Amazons of the Trojan war